Siyovush Zukhurov (born 5 June 1993) is a Tajikistani boxer. He competed in the men's super heavyweight event at the 2020 Summer Olympics.

References

External links

1993 births
Living people
Tajikistani male boxers
Olympic boxers of Tajikistan
Boxers at the 2020 Summer Olympics
Sportspeople from Dushanbe
Boxers at the 2010 Summer Youth Olympics